Alfred Oscar Elzner (1862–1933) was a prominent American architect in Cincinnati, Ohio.  Along with George M. Anderson, he formed a partnership known as the firm of Elzner & Anderson.

Biography of Elzner

Elzner studied art with Thomas Satterwhite Noble, C.T. Webber, and Frank Duveneck, and attended the Ohio Mechanics Institute and the Massachusetts Institute of Technology.  He worked for James W. McLaughlin in Cincinnati during the early 1880s and was superintendent for H.H. Richardson's Cincinnati Chamber of Commerce Building.  

Elzner established his own practice in 1887; he was joined by George M. Anderson in 1896. His firm, Elzner & Anderson, designed the Ingalls Building in Northwest Cincinnati at the intersection of Fourth Street and Vine Street, diagonally opposite Richardson's Chamber of Commerce Building. The Ingalls Building, named for railroad baron Melville E. Ingalls, is said to have been "the first reinforced concrete high-rise office building in the world." Elzner's clientele included members of the prominent Taft, Emery, Procter, and Bullock families, as well as "Cincinnati’s German-American elite."

Projects
 Children's Home Admin. Bldg. Cinti, Ohio  D.Meinken&Sons General Contractor Cinti, Ohio
 Children's Home East and West Homes Madisonville, Ohio D.Meinken&Sons Contractor Cinti, Ohio
 The Children's Hospital Nurses' Home  D.Meinken & Sons General Contractor Cinti, Ohio
 George Hoadley Jr. House in Cincinnati, NRHP listed
 Cincinnati Y.M.C.A. (before 1919) NWC Central Parkway and Elm St.
 Designs for the Cincinnati Country Club on Grandin Rd, Hyde Park
 Linden Place, Cincinnati (1924)
 Homestead Hotel, Hot Springs, Virginia one of architects credited.
 New Jerusalem Church, Cincinnati
 J.B. Schroder & Co. residence and hardware store in Cincinnati
 Old Timbers Lodge at the US Army Jefferson Proving Ground, approximately .5 mi. SE of jct. of K Rd. and Northeast Exit in Madison, Indiana (credited to Elzner), NRHP listed (built by Alexander Thomson?)
 Procter and Collier-Beau Brummell Building 440 E. McMillan St. in Cincinnati, NRHP listed
 Edward R. Stearns House 333 Oliver Rd. Wyoming, Ohio, NRHP listed
 Stimson Memorial Hall Maine 26 E side, .5 mi. N of jct. with US 202 Gray, Maine, NRHP listed
 Berea College, Kentucky (1932 addition and upgrade) to the first interracial and coeducational college in the South

References

Further reading
Obituary, Cincinnati Enquirer (12/7/1933);
Langsam (1997), 2, 4, 39, 64–65, 73, 89–90, 92, 97, 104–105, 106–107, 117, 140, 156;
Painter, Sullebarger, Merkel, AIC (2006), 77, 123, 138, 139, 147, 152, 154–56, 193, 215, 260, 280, 281;
Nuxhall, SGC, 17, Lot 60.

Architects from Cincinnati
1862 births
1933 deaths